Primarily known as long-fin tetra,  Brycinus longipinnis is also described as African long-finned tetra among other terms.

Distribution 

Brycinus longipinnis is native to the western coastal regions of Africa  from The Gambia to Democratic Republic of the Congo. It is found in the upper and lower reaches of big rivers and also in estuarine mixohaline waters. It is the only Brycinus species also to penetrate small rivers and streams.

Description 
Brycinus longipinnis will grow to at least five inches (12.5 cm) long although most specimens are smaller than this. 
The populations in the small streams are smaller fish than those in the big rivers.
Although it is essentially a freshwater fish, Brycinus longipinnis will live in brackish estuarine waters.

Diet 
Brycinus longipinnis eats a wide range of animal and vegetable matter, including insect larvae, crustaceans and some algae.

In the aquarium it will eat most fish foods including both flakes and pellets without any trouble; it benefits from live or frozen food such as bloodworms, brine shrimp and daphnia.

References

External links
 FishBase
 Zipcode Zoo
 African Long-Finned Tetra Fact Sheet
 Fish Geeks
 Brycinus longipinnis at aquabase.org
 Brycinus longipinnis at Catalogue of Life
 ITIS report
 Brycinus longipinnis at NCBI
 Brycinus longipinnis at Animal Diversity Web

Longipinnis
Freshwater fish of Africa
Fish described in 1864
Taxa named by Albert Günther
Tetras